The Interallied Mission to Poland was a diplomatic mission launched by British Prime Minister David Lloyd George on 21 July 1920, at the height of the Polish-Soviet War, weeks before the decisive Battle of Warsaw. The purpose of this mission was to send a number of high level personages from Britain and France to Poland in an attempt to influence Polish policy, possibly through effecting a change in government.

The mission members included French diplomat, Jean Jules Jusserand, general Maxime Weygand, chief of staff to Marshal Ferdinand Foch (the Supreme Commander of the victorious Entente), and the British diplomat, Lord Edgar Vincent D'Abernon. The crucial battle of Warsaw was won in the early days of August, before the mission could achieve anything of importance. The only tangible result was the installation of Weygand as an advisor to the Polish General Staff, where his role was negligible.  Nevertheless, soon after the battle and for various political reasons, a myth arose that Weygand was the author of the Polish victory in the battle of Warsaw.

Sources 
 Norman Davies, White Eagle, Red Star: the Polish-Soviet War, 1919-20, Pimlico, 2003, .
 Piotr Wandycz, General Weygand and the Battle of Warsaw, in Journal of Central European Affairs, 1960.

See also 
 British Military Mission to Poland
 French Military Mission to Poland

Polish–Soviet War
1920 in Poland
Poland–United Kingdom relations
France–Poland relations
1920 in France
1920 in the United Kingdom
1920 in international relations